This is a list of notable people of Hoboken, New Jersey. (B) denotes that the person was born there.

 Nick Acocella (1943–2020), political journalist and author
 Howard Aiken (1900–1973), pioneer in computing  (B)
 Richard Barone, musician; former frontman for Hoboken pop group The Bongos
 William Beutenmuller (1864–1934), entomologist who was curator of entomology at the American Museum of Natural History (B)
 Bob Borden (born 1969), writer for Late Show with David Letterman
 Joanne Borgella (1982–2014), Miss F.A.T 2005 on Mo'Nique's Fat Chance and a contestant on American Idol, Season 7
 Andre W. Brewster (1862–1942), Major General U.S. Army, recipient Medal of Honor (B)
 Marques Brownlee (born 1993), technology reviewer, known for his YouTube channel, MKBHD
 Michael Chang (born 1972), professional tennis player, French Open champion (B)
 Irwin Chusid (born 1951), radio personality, author, historian
 Vincent Cooke, S.J. (1936–2017), Jesuit priest and academic, President of Canisius College (1993–2010) (B)
 Vincent Copeland (1915–1993), actor, labor official, writer and political activist
 Jon Corzine (born 1947), Governor of New Jersey
 Ronald Dario (1937–2004), politician who represented the 33rd Legislative District in the New Jersey General Assembly from 1984 to 1986
 Willem de Kooning (1904–1997), 20th-century painter
 Anthony DePalma (born 1952), author, journalist and educator who was a foreign correspondent and reporter for The New York Times
 Paul Aaron Langevin Doty (1869–1938), mechanical engineer who served as the 53rd president of the American Society of Mechanical Engineers(B)
 Mark D'Onofrio (born 1969), NFL player(B)
 Albert J. Dunlap (1937–2019), business executive, known for company downsizing, earning him the nickname "Chainsaw Al"
 John J. Eagan (1872–1956), United States Representative from New Jersey (B)
 Dawn Eden, author, journalist, rock historian
 Sam Esmail (born 1977), television producer known for Mr. Robot and Homecoming (B)
 Luke Faust (born 1936), musician
 Julio Fernández (born 1954), guitarist and composer best known as the current and longtime guitarist for the jazz-fusion band Spyro Gyra
 Michele Fitzgerald (born 1990), winner of Survivor: Kaôh Rōng and second runner-up on Survivor: Winners at War
 Cristina Fontanelli, opera singer
 Ken Freedman (born 1959), radio executive and personality at WFMU
 Bill Frisell (born 1951), avant-garde musician and composer
 Thomas Gallo (1914–1994), politician who served 11 years in the New Jersey General Assembly, including five full terms representing the 33rd Legislative District(B)
 Kyla Garcia, stage, film, and television actress and audiobook narrator (B)
 Dorothy Gibson (1889–1946), pioneering silent film actress; Titanic survivor (B)
 John Grefe (1947–2013), International Master of chess(B)
 Hetty Green (1834–1916), businesswoman/entrepreneur
 Pia Guerra (born 1972), comic book artist and cartoonist, who is co-creator of Y The Last Man, cartoonist for The New Yorker and The Nib (B)
 Reema Harrysingh-Carmona (born 1970), former First Lady of Trinidad and Tobago (B)
 Nat Hickey (born 1902), oldest person to play an NBA game  (B)
 Chaim Hirschensohn (1857–1935), Chief Rabbi of Hoboken and early Zionist leader
 Juliet Huddy (born 1969), Fox News personality
 August William Hutaf (1879–1942), illustrator, commercial artist, and advertising executive (B)
 Anthony Impreveduto (1948–2009), member of the New Jersey General Assembly 1987–2004
 Kate Jacobs (born 1959), singer-songwriter who released her fifth album Home Game in 2011
 Mike Jerrick (born 1954), host of the morning television series Fox & Friends
 Carroll N. Jones III (1944–2017), artist in the style of American realism
 Alfred Kinsey (1894–1956), psychologist who studied sexual behavior (B)
 Jay I. Kislak (1922–2018), businessman, philanthropist, bibliophile, and aviator (B)
 Mathias Kiwanuka (born 1983), linebacker who played for the New York Giants
 Alfred L. Kroeber (1876–1960), anthropologist; first professor appointed to the Department of Anthropology at the University of California, Berkeley; known for his association with the Native American man Ishi (B)
 Johnny Kucks (1933–2013), pitcher who won the World Series twice with the New York Yankees (B)
 Artie Lange (born 1967), comedian, radio personality on The Howard Stern Show
 Dorothea Lange (1895–1965), photographer during the Great Depression for the FSA, and of the Japanese internment program
 Jack Lazorko (born 1956), former pitcher for the Milwaukee Brewers, Seattle Mariners, and California Angels
 Caroline Leavitt (born 1952), author
 David Levithan (born 1972), young adult fiction author and editor
 Mark Leyner (born 1956), post-modern author
 G. Gordon Liddy (1930–2021), Watergate conspirator; radio talk show host (B)
 William Lowell Sr. (1863–1954), dentist and an inventor of a wooden golf tee patented in 1921 (B)
 Janet Lupo (1950–2017), Playboy Playmate for November 1975 (B)
 Eli Manning (born 1981), Super Bowl champion quarterback for the New York Giants
 Patrick McDonnell (born 1956), cartoonist, author and playwright who is the creator of the syndicated daily comic strip Mutts
 Dorothy Blackwell McNeil (born 1940s), African-American nightclub owner
 Bob Menendez (born 1954), United States Senator who served as mayor of Union City
 Kawika Mitchell (born 1979), linebacker who played for the New York Giants
 Natalie Morales (born 1972), television personality, NBC News and The Today Show
 Keturah Orji (born 1996), track and field athlete specializing in the triple jump who was selected as part of the U.S. team at the 2016 Summer Olympics (B)
 Jesse Palmer (born 1978), NFL quarterback featured on TV show The Bachelor
 Joe Pantoliano (born 1951), actor (B)
 Tom Pelphrey (born 1982), actor, won an Emmy for his role on Guiding Light
 Maria Pepe (born 1960), first girl to play Little League baseball (B)
 Daniel Pinkwater (born 1941), National Public Radio commentator; author
 Anna Quindlen (born 1952), columnist, novelist
 James Rado (1932–2022), co-creator of the Broadway Musical Hair
 Gerome Ragni (1935–1991), co-creator of the Broadway Musical Hair
 Alex Rodriguez (born 1975), professional baseball player for the New York Yankees
 Frederick H. Rohr (1896–1965), entrepreneur and engineer who founded Rohr Aircraft (B)
 Carlos Saldanha (born 1965), director of animated films, including the Ice Age films and Rio
 Robert Charles Sands (1799–1832), writer
 John Sayles (born 1950), filmmaker and author
 Dave Schramm, musician who played with Yo La Tengo and the Schramms
 Charles Schreyvogel (1861–1912), painter of Western subject matter in the days of the disappearing frontier
 Steve Sesnick (1941–2022), rock club and rock band manager (B)
 Steve Shelley (born 1963), drummer for rock band Sonic Youth
 Frank Sinatra (1915–1998), singer and actor; winner of Academy Award and Grammy Lifetime Achievement Award; namesake of Hoboken's Frank Sinatra Park and Sinatra Drive (B)
 Jack Stephans (1939–2020), American football coach who was head coach at Jersey City State College, William Paterson University and Fordham University (B)
 Edwin Augustus Stevens (1795–1868), engineer, inventor and entrepreneur
 Colonel John Stevens (1749–1838), inventor; founder of Hoboken
 John Cox Stevens (1785–1857), first Commodore of the New York Yacht Club
 Robert L. Stevens (1787–1856), inventor, who was the son of Colonel John Stevens (B)
 Alfred Stieglitz (1864–1946), leading figure of 19th and early 20th-century American photography (B)
 Joe Sulaitis (1921–1980), running back for the New York Giants of the NFL, 1943–1953
 Jeff Tamarkin, editor, author and historian
 Tyshawn Taylor (born 1990), basketball player with the Brooklyn Nets
 Rosemarie Totaro (1933–2018), politician who served two separate stints in the New Jersey General Assembly representing the 23rd Legislative District (B)
 Buddy Valastro (born 1977), baker and television personality, known for Cake Boss (B)
 Philip A. White (1823–1891), pharmacist, aristocrat, advocate and school board member
 Blind Tom Wiggins (1849–1908), ex-slave; piano prodigy
 Frank Winters (born 1964), NFL player for four teams
 Edwin R. V. Wright (1812–1871), represented New Jersey's 5th congressional district, 1865–1867
 Pia Zadora (born 1954), singer and actress (B)

References

Hoboken